Wadi is a city and a municipal council in the Nagpur district of the Indian state of Maharashtra. It connected with National Highway NH-53.

Demographics
 India census, Wadi had a population of 40,147. Males constitute 53% of the population and females 47%. Wadi has an average literacy rate of 78%, higher than the national average of 59.5%: Male literacy is 82%, and female literacy is 74%. In Wadi, 14% of the population is under 6 years of age.

Other Features
Godowns (warehouses) are common place in wadi. NH53 also a (Asian highway 46) traverses through Wadi.

References

Cities and towns in Nagpur district